AFIL may refer to:

All-for-Ireland League, an Irish party
A Friend In London, a Danish music band
Audio induction loop, also known as Audio-frequency induction loops (AFIL)